South Mountain is an  peak in San Juan County, Utah in the United States, about  north of La Sal, Utah. It is part of the La Sal Mountains. Precipitation runoff from this mountain drains into tributaries of the Colorado River. The nearest town is Moab,  to the northwest, and the nearest higher neighbor is Mount Tukuhnikivatz,  to the north.

Climate
Spring and fall are the most favorable seasons to visit the South Mountain area. According to the Köppen climate classification system, it is located in a Cold semi-arid climate zone, which is defined by the coldest month having an average mean temperature below 32 °F (0 °C), and at least 50% of the total annual precipitation being received during the spring and summer.

Gallery

See also

 Colorado Plateau
 List of mountain peaks of Utah

References

External links
 Weather forecast: South Mountain

Mountains of San Juan County, Utah
North American 3000 m summits
Manti-La Sal National Forest